The 2014–15 Eurocup Basketball season was the 13th edition of Europe's second-tier level transnational competition for men's professional basketball clubs, the EuroCup. The EuroCup is the European-wide league level that is one level below the EuroLeague.

Khimki won the competition, after beating Herbalife Gran Canaria in the Finals, and earned a spot in the regular season of the 2015–16 Euroleague.

Competition format
The competition format was the same as in the 2013–14 season, but reducing the Regular Season. For this year 36 teams joined this first stage and were divided into two conferences.

The Regular Season featured six groups of six teams each one, where the four best teams qualified to the Last 32 stage with the eight teams that do not qualify to the 2014–15 Euroleague Top 16. From this stage to the final, the format was the same as in the last season.

Teams
Teams were confirmed on June 26 by the company Euroleague Basketball.

Notes:
† Qualified through wild card
^ Qualified as loser of Euroleague qualifying round

Draw
The draws for the 2014–15 Eurocup were held on Monday, 29 September, after the Euroleague Qualifying Rounds were played.

Teams were divided into two geographical conferences with 18 teams and 3 groups each.
For the each conference teams were seeded into six pots of Three teams in accordance with the Club Ranking, based on their performance in European competitions during a three-year period.

Two teams from the same country could not be drawn together in the same Regular Season group if possible. The nations from the former Yugoslavia, which compete jointly in the Adriatic League—Serbia, Croatia, Slovenia, Montenegro, Macedonia and Bosnia and Herzegovina—are considered as one country for purposes of the draw.

Western Conference

Eastern Conference

Regular season

The Regular Season runs from Tuesday, October 14 to Wednesday, December 17.

If teams were level on record at the end of the Regular Season, tiebreakers were applied in the following order:
 Head-to-head record.
 Head-to-head point differential.
 Point differential during the Regular Season.
 Points scored during the regular season.
 Sum of quotients of points scored and points allowed in each Regular Season match.

Western Conference

Group A

Group B

Group C

Eastern Conference

Group D

Group E

Group F

Last 32
The Last 32 phase runs from Tuesday, January 6 to Wednesday, February 11.

If teams were level on record at the end of the Last 32 phase, tiebreakers were applied in the following order:
 Head-to-head record.
 Head-to-head point differential.
 Point differential during the Last 32 phase.
 Points scored during the Last 32 phase.
 Sum of quotients of points scored and points allowed in each Last 32 phase match.

Group G

Group H

Group I

Group J

Group K

Group L

Group M

Group N

Knockout stage

In the knockout phase rounds will be played in a home-and-away format, with the overall cumulative score determining the winner of a round. Thus, the score of one single game can be tied.

The team that finished in the higher Last 32 place will play the second game of the series at home.
If both teams placed the same in the Last 32, the team with more Last 32 victories will play the second game at home.
In case of a tie in both place and victories, the team with the higher cumulative Last 32 point difference will play the second game at home.

Finals

First leg

Second leg

Individual statistics

Rating

Points

Rebounds

Assists

Awards

MVP Weekly

Regular season

Last 32

Eighthfinals

Quarterfinals

Semifinals

Finals

Eurocup MVP
  Tyrese Rice (Khimki)

Eurocup Finals MVP
  Tyrese Rice (Khimki)

All-Eurocup Teams

Coach of the Year
 Aíto García Reneses (Herbalife Gran Canaria)

Rising Star
 Kristaps Porziņģis (Sevilla)

See also
2014–15 Euroleague
2014–15 EuroChallenge

Notes

References

External links
Eurocup official website

 
EuroCup Basketball seasons
Euro